or  is a lake in the municipality of Hamarøy in Nordland county, Norway. The European route E6 highway runs along the eastern shore of the lake. The large lake Rekvatnet lies just to the east and the lake Sandnesvatnet lies just to the north of this lake.

See also
List of lakes in Norway

References

Hamarøy
Lakes of Nordland